Stefano Mainetti is an Italian composer and conductor.

Biography 
Attended Santa Cecilia Conservatory of Rome where he earned a Bachelor of Music, summa cum laude, in Composition and a 1st class honors Master of Music in Film Scoring degree.
He studied Conducting with Cesare Croci and Ennio Nicotra and holds a BA, magna cum laude, in Anthropology and Political Science with a published dissertation on Richard Wagner. He was a student of Giorgio Caproni, one of the greatest 20th century Italian poet, his teacher at the primary school, who influenced his musical and artistic training.

Professor of Music Composition for Film and Theatre at the Conservatory of Santa Cecilia in Rome, Stefano is one of the founders of the ACMF, the Italian Association of Music Composers for Films.

Writes music for cinema, theatre and television.  Works in Italy and the United States.
"Personalità Europea - Oscar dei Giovani" in Rome (1983) for the theme of "TG l'Una" on "Rai Uno", and prize "Agimus" (1996) for the best original soundtrack for the short film Sera.
One of the two composers who wrote the music for the CD Abbà Pater,.
Work in the United States includes writing and conducting the music for films such as The Shooter (1995 film)   directed by Ted Kotcheff, Silent Trigger and Tale of the Mummy 
(Best Soundtrack award at the 18th Fantafestival), both films directed by Russell Mulcahy.
"Cinemusic Ravello Festival award" in 2005 for best soundtrack of the Italian TV series Orgoglio (Pride). 
In 2006 and 2007 he was a member of the panel in the Sanremo Music Festival.
In 2006 winner of the "Anica Award" for the soundtrack of the film "A voce alta".
In 2007 was awarded the "Salvo Randone" prize for his career.

From 2007 to 2010 composed and conducted the music for The Word of Promise the US audio drama of the Bible in 79 CDs with the voices of Jim Caviezel, Richard Dreyfuss, Michael York, Jon Voight, Max von Sydow, Malcolm McDowell, Stacy Keach, Terence Stamp, Louis Gossett Jr. and 600 other actors.
In 2009 was one of the composers of the music for the CD Alma Mater, performed by the Royal Philharmonic Orchestra.  This work received a nomination as "Album of the Year" at the Classic Brit Awards in London 2010.
In 2011 he composed and produced Tu es Christus  a Sony Music cd for the beatification of Pope John Paul II in which featured, amongst others, the voices of Andrea Bocelli and Plácido Domingo.  "International Euro Mediterraneo Award" in Campidoglio, Rome and "Napoli Cultural Classic Award" for Best Italian Musician in 2011.

In 2014, for Musa Comunicazione, he published the book "La politica musicale nazista e l'influenza del culto wagneriano". In 2021 he was co-author, together with Simone Corelli e Gilberto Martinelli, of the treatise “Dialoghi, Musica, Effetti: il Suono nell’audiovisivo”. The book, published by Lambda, won the critics’ award at the “Premio Letterario Internazionale Città di Cattolica”.

Stefano is the author of "Rendering Revolution". The project was presented at the MAXXI National Art Museum in Rome on 12 June 2017, an “augmented music” experience in which music, painting, dance and video art are blended together in a spatial setting. The project aims to be a new synthesis and fusion among different art forms. A modern melodrama, in the most extended sense of the term, a non linear process in which the result is superior to the sum of the parts and in which each component - music, dance, painting and video art - concurs in creating an augmented reality that engrosses the spectator on a multi sensory level. "Rendering Revolution", presented by the National Academy of Santa Cecilia, took two years of planning and has received the honorable mention award from Santa Cecilia Conservatory for its exceptional scientific and artistic achievement.

He is among the Italian personalities participating in the Charte 18-XXI, a collective of artists, scientists and philosophers brought together by Emmanuel Demarcy-Mota, artistic director of the Théâtre de la Ville-Paris, with the aim of promoting international theatre, with young people and for young people, through a working method and a comparison never made before in the theatrical panorama. As a demonstration of the desire shared by various cultural personalities to create a new space for discussion and dialogue, productions from all over the world participate in the project, including the Teatro della Pergola in Florence.

Private life 
He is married with the actress Elena Sofia Ricci.

Selected filmography 
Voglia di guardare, Joe D'Amato (1986)
Appuntamento a Trieste, Bruno Mattei (1987)
Interzone, Deran Sarafian (1987)
Cartoline Italiane, Memè Perlini (1987)
Strike Commando 2, Bruno Mattei (1988)
Ratman, Giuliano Carnimeo (1988)
Eurocops, Gianni Lepre (1988)
Zombi 3, Lucio Fulci (1988)
Leathernecks, Ignazio Dolce (1989)
Il Ventre di Maria, Memè Perlini (1992)
Donna d'onore 2, Ralph L. Thomas (1993)
L'Assassino è quello con le scarpe gialle, Filippo Ottoni (1993)
Trinità & Bambino... e adesso tocca a noi, Enzo Barboni (1995)
The Shooter, Ted Kotcheff (1995)
Silent Trigger, Russell Mulcahy (1996)
Sub Down, Gregg Champion (1997)
Tale of the Mummy, Russell Mulcahy (1998)
Orgoglio, Giorgio Serafini  (2004)TV Movie
A voce alta, Vincenzo Verdecchi (2006)
15 Seconds, Gianluca Petrazzi (2008)
Agata e Ulisse, Maurizio Nichetti (2010) Tv Movie
100 metri dal Paradiso,  Raffaele Verzillo (2011–2012)
Le due leggi,  Luciano Manuzzi (2014) Tv Movie
Maia,  Alessandro Prete (2016) Short Film

Symphonic Project 
Abbà Pater,  Sony Classical USA (1999)
The Word of Promise, USA (2007–2010) Jobe Cerny
Alma Mater, UK (2009)
Tu es Christus, Ita (2011) Sony Music
Rendering Revolution, Ita (2017) Santa Cecilia Academy

Notes

External links 
 
 Stefano Mainetti, official website 
 Stefano Mainetti at Discogs
 Rendering Revolution 

Living people
Italian film score composers
Italian male film score composers
1957 births
Musicians from Rome
Academic staff of Conservatorio Santa Cecilia
20th-century Italian composers
21st-century Italian composers
Conservatorio Santa Cecilia alumni
20th-century Italian male musicians
21st-century Italian male musicians